Defending champions Rajeev Ram and Joe Salisbury defeated Wesley Koolhof and Neal Skupski in the final, 7–6(7–4), 7–5 to win the men's doubles tennis title at the 2022 US Open. They became the second team in the Open Era to defend the US Open title, after Todd Woodbridge and Mark Woodforde in 1996. It was both men's fifth major title.

Salisbury retained his ATP number 1 doubles ranking by winning the championship. Michael Venus, Horacio Zeballos, Mate Pavić, Jean-Julien Rojer, and Skupski were also in contention for the top ranking.

This tournament marked the final professional appearance of former doubles world No. 2 and six-time doubles major champion Bruno Soares; partnering with Jamie Murray, he lost in the second round to Hugo Nys and Jan Zieliński.

This is the first edition of US Open to feature a 10-point tie-break, when the score reaches six games all in the deciding set. Marcelo Demoliner and João Sousa defeated Marcel Granollers and Zeballos in the first round in the first main-draw 10-point tie-break at US Open.

Seeds

Draw

Finals

Top half

Section 1

Section 2

Bottom half

Section 3

Section 4

Other entry information

Wild cards

Protected ranking

Alternates

Withdrawals
Before the tournament
  Pedro Cachín /  Francisco Cerúndolo → replaced by  Petros Tsitsipas /  Stefanos Tsitsipas
  Roberto Carballés Baena /  Pablo Carreño Busta → replaced by  Federico Coria /  Cristian Rodríguez
  Sadio Doumbia /  Fabien Reboul → replaced by  Diego Hidalgo /  Fabien Reboul
  Tommy Paul /  Jack Sock → replaced by  Daniel Altmaier /  Thiago Monteiro
  Diego Schwartzman /  Camilo Ugo Carabelli → replaced by  Nikoloz Basilashvili /  Hans Hach Verdugo

See also 
2022 US Open – Day-by-day summaries

References

External links
 Draw

Men's Doubles
US Open - Men's Doubles
US Open (tennis) by year – Men's doubles